Claes Fellbom (born 29 January 1943) is a Swedish film director, screenwriter, and composer, and a librettist and opera stage director. He is the founder and managing director of Folkoperan. This company he led for 36 years.
In 1989 he started his international career and after that he had at least one premier per year. He also wrote libretti to nine operas. Among others: Marie Antoinette, Zarah and JEPPE.
He has also written several books.

He collaborated with composer Sven-David Sandström on Jeppe: The Cruel Comedy (2001), and made a notorious film of Giuseppe Verdi's Aida, with Folkoperan in 1987, which was performed topless.  He also wrote the libretti for Daniel Börtz's Marie Antoinette (1998) and Svall (2005) and Qu Xiaosong's Oedipus.

Filmography
Aida (1987) (director, screen adaptation)
Carmen (1983) (director, Swedish translation)
Skottet (The Shot) (1969) (director, co-writer, co-composer)
Agent 0,5 och Kvarten - fattaruväl! (1968) (director only)
Carmilla (1969) (director, screenwriter, composer)
Ska' ru' me' på fest? (1966) (director, screenwriter, composer)

External links

Claes Fellbom and the birth of the Swedish Folk Opera
Claes Fellbom Operabase

Living people
1943 births
20th-century classical composers
Swedish film directors
Swedish theatre directors
Swedish opera directors
Male classical composers
20th-century male musicians